Hydroxypregnanedione may refer to:

 Alfaxalone (3α-hydroxy-5α-pregnane-11,20-dione)
 Hydroxydione (21-hydroxy-5β-pregnane-3,20-dione)
 Renanolone (3α-hydroxy-5β-pregnane-11,20-dione)

See also
 Progesterone
 Hydroxyprogesterone
 Pregnanolone
 Pregnanedione
 Pregnanediol
 Pregnanetriol
 Dihydroprogesterone

Pregnanes